Bananarama are an English pop trio from London, formed as a trio in 1980 by friends Sara Dallin, Siobhan Fahey, and Keren Woodward. Fahey left the group in 1988 and was replaced by Jacquie O'Sullivan until 1991, when the trio became a duo. Their success on both pop and dance charts saw them listed in the Guinness World Records for achieving the world's highest number of chart entries by an all-female group. Between 1982 and 2009, they had 30 singles reach the Top 50 of the UK Singles Chart.

The group's UK top-10 hits include "It Ain't What You Do..." (1982), "Really Saying Something" (1982), "Shy Boy" (1982), "Na Na Hey Hey Kiss Him Goodbye" (1983), "Cruel Summer" (1983), "Robert De Niro's Waiting..." (1984),  "Love in the First Degree" (1987), "I Want You Back" in 1988, and charity track "Help!" in 1989. In 1986, they had a U.S. number one with another of their UK top-10 hits, a cover of "Venus". In total, they had 11 singles reach the US Billboard Hot 100 (1983–1988), including the top-10 hits "Cruel Summer" (1984) and "I Heard a Rumour" (1987). They are associated with the MTV-driven Second British Invasion of the US. The trio performed on "Do They Know It's Christmas?", a UK chart-topping collaborative charity single released in 1984. They topped the Australian ARIA albums chart in June 1988 with Wow! (1987), and earned Brit Award nominations for Best British Single for "Love in the First Degree", and Best Music Video for their 1988 hit cover of the Supremes single "Nathan Jones".

Fahey left the group in 1988 and formed Shakespears Sister, best known for the UK number one "Stay" (1992). She was replaced by Jacquie O'Sullivan. This line-up had UK top-five hits with "I Want You Back", (1988) and a cover of The Beatles' "Help!" (1989) recorded with comedy duo French and Saunders and comedian Kathy Burke for the charity Comic Relief. They also charted with "Love, Truth and Honesty" and "Nathan Jones". 
In 1989, they embarked on their first world tour and had another hit with a new remixed version of "Cruel Summer". 
In 1990 and 1991, they had top-30 hits with "Only Your Love", "Preacher Man", and "Long Train Running" and new studio album Pop Life, which featured these singles and a fourth, "Tripping on Your Love", which was released soon after the album. 
After O'Sullivan's late-1991 departure, Dallin and Woodward continued Bananarama as a duo, with further top-30 hits including "Movin' On" (1992), "More, More, More" (1993), "Move in My Direction" (2005), and "Look on the Floor (Hypnotic Tango) (2005)". 
Fahey temporarily rejoined Bananarama in 2017 and they toured the UK and North America between November that year and August 2018.

Career

1980–1982: Early years
Bananarama formed in September 1980 when teenagers and childhood friends Sara Dallin and Keren Woodward moved from Bristol to London and met Siobhan Fahey. Dallin and Fahey were studying journalism at the London College of Fashion (University of Arts) and Woodward was working at the BBC in Portland Place. Dallin and Woodward were living at the YWCA and were about to be made homeless until Paul Cook, with whom they had become friends after meeting at a club, offered them a place to live above the former Sex Pistols rehearsal room in Denmark Street, Charing Cross. They took their name, in part, from the Roxy Music song "Pyjamarama".

The trio were ardent followers of the punk rock and post-punk music scenes during the late 1970s and early 1980s. They often performed impromptu sets or backing vocals at gigs for such bands as The Monochrome Set, The Professionals, Subway Sect, Iggy Pop, Department S, The Nipple Erectors, and The Jam. In 1981, Bananarama recorded their first demo, "Aie a Mwana", a cover of a song by Black Blood, sung in Swahili. The demo was heard at Demon Records, who consequently offered Bananarama their first deal. The song was an underground hit (UK #92) and Bananarama were signed by Decca (later London Records) and remained on the label until 1993. UK music magazine The Face featured an article on Bananarama after the release of their first single. This caught the attention of ex-Specials member Terry Hall, who invited them to collaborate with his new vocal group Fun Boy Three on their album and the single "It Ain't What You Do (It's The Way That You Do It)". In 1982, the song hit the Top 5 in the UK and gave Bananarama their first significant mainstream success. Fun Boy Three then guested on Bananarama's single, "Really Saying Something", later that year.

1982–1985: Deep Sea Skiving and Bananarama
Bananarama experienced their greatest success during the period 1982 to 1989, with their first three albums primarily produced and co-written with Jolley & Swain. Their debut album, Deep Sea Skiving (UK #7, US #63) (1983) contained several hit singles – "Really Saying Something" (UK #5) and "Shy Boy" (UK #4) – and included a cover version of "Na Na Hey Hey Kiss Him Goodbye" (UK #5). "Cheers Then" (#45) was released as the third single, with little chart success, but very positive reviews from critics. The band recorded a version of the Sex Pistols' song "No Feelings" in late 1982 for the soundtrack of the British teen-comedy film, Party Party.

During 1982 and 1983, Bananarama did several promotional US press tours and TV appearances on American Bandstand and Solid Gold. Success in the United States came in 1984 with a Top Ten hit "Cruel Summer".

Their second album, Bananarama (UK #16, US #30) (1984) was a more socially conscious effort. The group wanted to be taken more seriously, so they wrote songs that focused on heavier topics. "Hot Line To Heaven" (UK #58) is a stand against the drugs-are-cool culture. Meanwhile, "Rough Justice" (UK #23) was written about Thomas "Kidso" Reilly, the band's road manager and brother of Fahey's boyfriend Jim Reilly (drummer of the Northern Irish punk band Stiff Little Fingers), who was shot and killed by a British soldier in Belfast in August 1983. The album also contained the hit singles, "Robert De Niro's Waiting..." (UK #3) and their first US Top 10 hit, "Cruel Summer" (UK #8, US #9) (1983), which was included in the film The Karate Kid. The trio also recorded the single, "The Wild Life" (US #70) for a 1984 American film of the same name.

In 1984, Bananarama featured on the Band Aid single, "Do They Know It's Christmas?" and were the only artists to appear on both the original 1984 Band Aid and the 1989 Band Aid II versions (Fahey appeared on the 1984 version while O'Sullivan appeared on the 1989 version).

1985 was a quiet transitional year for Bananarama. The single "Do Not Disturb" (UK #31), which would appear on their next album, maintained their public profile.

1986–1987: True Confessions and international success
1986 saw the release of their third Jolley/Swain album, True Confessions. Later editions contained other tracks and extra production duties by Mike Stock, Matt Aitken, and Pete Waterman known as Stock Aitken Waterman (SAW). The move resulted in the international number one hit, "Venus", (a remake of Shocking Blue's song from 1969, which had been a number 1 hit in 1970). The dance-oriented production typified the SAW approach to pop music. Bananarama had tracked the producers down after hearing "You Spin Me Round (Like a Record)" by Dead or Alive. The song won a Juno Award in Canada for International Single of The Year. Also in 1986, Dallin and Woodward were featured as backing vocalists on two songs on Family Album, produced by John Lydon.

The music video for "Venus" received heavy airplay on MTV in the United States. It featured the group in various costumes including a devil, a French temptress, a vampire, and Greek goddesses. The video marked a pivotal shift towards a more glamorous and sexy image, which contrasted with their tomboyish appearances in their earlier work.

Follow-up singles "More Than Physical" (UK #41) and "A Trick of the Night" (UK #32) were less successful, which unfortunately had less promotion. Woodward was pregnant with her son Thomas at the time and was unable to tour or physically promote the album or its subsequent singles.

"More Than Physical" marked the beginning of Bananarama's songwriting relationship with Stock Aitken Waterman. It was a collaborative process that Stock has described as troubled, despite producing a string of hits.

“It’s very difficult to be creative if someone’s just going to mock you, or laugh at you,” he said. “With Bananarama it was just awkward, all the time very awkward, and I didn’t feel comfortable writing with them.”

During a press tour in New York City, the group also recorded a song "Riskin' a Romance" featured in the film The Secret of My Success (1987). The track was notable because it featured Fahey taking lead vocals, and Daryl Hall was the producer. During this trip, the group also re-recorded the vocals for their next UK release "More Than Physical" and "A Trick of the Night" with Mike Stock in Miami.

In March 1987, Bananarama participated in the recording of the single "Let It Be" (UK #1) as members of the charity supergroup Ferry Aid. All sales from the single were donated to charity in response to the capsizing of the ferry MS Herald of Free Enterprise, which killed 193 people. Among the featured singers was Woodward, who sang with Nick Kamen.

1987–1988: Wow! and Fahey's departure
In the wake of the success of "Venus", Bananarama began work on the album Wow! The group's sound successfully shifted towards dance-oriented Europop under the direction of Pete Waterman, but the creative process on the project was often fraught, with Matt Aitken describing the band's contribution to song writing as minimal.

Wow! was released on 4 September 1987 by London Records. It topped the Australian ARIA album charts for one week in June 1988.

"I Heard a Rumour" (UK #14, US #4) was their strongest performing international hit from this album. The track bears notable similarities in part to Michael Fortunati's "Give Me Up", which was released in early 1986. However, producer Mike Stock denied the track was based excessively on that record, insisting "I Heard A Rumor" was simply broadly inspired by Europop trends at the time. "We didn't do sampling... There's no similarity in the lyric, there's no actual similarity in terms of note-for-noteness in the tune," he said. "We were doing Europop."

"Love in the First Degree" (UK #3), one of their biggest UK hits, was nominated at the 1988 Brit Awards for best single. Producer Pete Waterman claimed he had to threaten to pull SAW off the Wow! project in order to force the release of the track as a single, after it was dismissed by the band and label as too commercial.

A further single, "I Can't Help It" (which boasted a semi-controversial video featuring the group in a milk bath filled with fruit and half-naked men), was also a hit (UK #20).

After the third single from Wow! was released in early 1988, Fahey – who had married Eurythmics' Dave Stewart – left the group. Her last performance as a member of the group was "Love in the First Degree" at the Brit Awards in February 1988. She would later resurface in the BRIT Award–winning pop duo Shakespears Sister with Marcella Detroit.

1988–1991: Second line-up, Greatest Hits, Pop Life and world tour
After Fahey's exit, Jacquie O'Sullivan (formerly of the Shillelagh Sisters) joined the group in March 1988. The single "I Want You Back" (UK #5) was re-recorded with O'Sullivan, as was The Supremes cover "Nathan Jones" (UK #15) which was nominated for best video at the 1989 Brit Awards. "Love, Truth and Honesty" (UK #23) was released as a single from their 1988 retrospective compilation, Greatest Hits Collection (UK #3). At the same time, Bananarama entered the Guinness Book of World Records as the all-female group who have the most UK chart entries in history, a record they still hold.

Initial tensions began to appear within the new lineup around this time, with O'Sullivan complaining that there were no photographs of her displayed at the Soho launch of Greatest Hits Collection, and tour preparation marked by her bandmates' discomfort with her partying lifestyle.

As a fundraising charity single for Comic Relief in 1989, Bananarama recorded a cover of The Beatles' song "Help!" with Lananeeneenoonoo (UK #3), a mock girl-group created by British female comedy duo French and Saunders, with fellow comedian Kathy Burke. Also in 1989, the band embarked upon their first world tour, which included shows in North America, East Asia, and the UK.

Bananarama's 1991 album, Pop Life, saw Dallin's and Woodward's songwriting collaboration with their friend Youth. They worked with a variety of producers including Youth, Shep Pettibone, and Steve Jolley of Jolley & Swain. They also incorporated a wider range of musical genres including reggae, flamenco guitar, and acid house. Singles "Only Your Love" (UK #27), "Preacher Man" (UK #20), a cover of the Doobie Brothers' "Long Train Running" (UK #30), and "Tripping on Your Love" (UK #76) were the group's final releases with O'Sullivan. This album received some of the strongest and most positive reviews of their career.

1992–2001: Duo re-launch, Please Yourself, Ultra Violet and Exotica
In 1992, Dallin and Woodward returned as a duo and had a UK top 30 hit with "Movin' On" (UK #24), which was the first single from the 1993 album Please Yourself. Other singles from the album were "Last Thing on My Mind" (UK #71) and a cover of the 1976 Andrea True Connection song "More, More, More" (UK #24). This album was Bananarama's last one on London Records.

Their next offering was 1995's Ultra Violet (entitled I Found Love in Japan) on a new label. The album and its three singles — "I Found Love", "Every Shade of Blue", and "Take Me to Your Heart" — were only released in some European countries, North America, Japan, and Australia, but not in Britain.

In 1998, Dallin and Woodward asked Fahey to join them to record the track "Waterloo" (a cover of the classic ABBA song) for the Eurovision celebration A Song for Eurotrash on Channel 4. However, Fahey made it clear that it was a one-off and that she was not formally rejoining the group. In 1999, Dallin, Woodward, and Fahey were interviewed together for an episode of the BBC music documentary series Young Guns Go For It dedicated to the group. Jacquie O'Sullivan also took part in the programme.

In 2001, Dallin and Woodward, who had been frequently working in France, had recorded the album Exotica with the French label M6. The album also included a cover of George Michael's "Careless Whisper", Latin- and R&B-influenced dance songs, and reinterpreted versions of their earlier hits.

2002–2006: Drama
By 2002, Bananarama had sold 40 million records worldwide. That year, they released another greatest hits album, The Very Best of Bananarama, in the UK. They also recorded the song "Love Him, Leave Him, Forget Him" for Sky TV's show Is Harry on the Boat? as well as the song "U R My Baby" for a German disco project. With Siobhan Fahey returning as a special guest for a performance of "Venus", the group celebrated the 20th anniversary of their first hit with a gig at G-A-Y at the London Astoria, in front of an audience of 3,000 people. 

With 1980s retro in vogue, Bananarama made a comeback in the British dance charts in 2005. Solasso remixed their early hit "Really Saying Something". A video was filmed with models from Britain's Next Top Model TV show.

In 2005, Dallin and Woodward collaborated with Swedish hit makers Murlyn, writing and recording in Sweden for 6 months to produce the album 'Drama'. The first single "Move in My Direction" reached #14. The second single "Look on the Floor (Hypnotic Tango)" entered and peaked at #26 on the UK charts. In the US on the Billboard Dance Chart, "Look on the Floor" peaked at #2 and "Move in My Direction" reached #14 in July 2006.

2006–2011: Remasters and Viva

Summer 2006 saw the Warner Bros. Records release of The Twelve Inches of Bananarama, a compilation of twelve remixes on CD for the first time. The collection includes the rare George Michael remix of "Tripping on Your Love", among others.

On 19 March 2007, Bananarama's first six studio albums were reissued by Rhino Records on CD with bonus material, including alternative versions, remixes, and B-sides. On 7 May 2007, another best-of collection titled Greatest Hits and More More More was released by Warner Bros. Records.

Dallin and Woodward performed a set along with other 1980s acts at Retro Fest on 1 September 2007 at Culzean Castle in Ayrshire, Scotland.

By February 2007, Bananarama were back in the studio recording new material. A cover version of "Voyage Voyage" was performed at a concert in France. Bananarama also confirmed they were contributing vocals as guest artists on the song "Ultra Violet" (not to be confused with Bananarama's seventh album Ultra Violet) by new dance act Block Rocker, a teaming up of producers/remixers Digital Dog and Ashiva. However, the song never surfaced.

In 2008, Bananarama appeared on the Here and Now Tour with other 1980s artists such as Belinda Carlisle, Paul Young, ABC, and Rick Astley. They also planned to record a new album of disco cover versions and new songs.

In August 2008, Bananarama were back in the studio recording a track with Rev Run from Run-D.M.C. who had a new album in the pipeline. He wanted to sample "Na Na Hey Hey Kiss Him Goodbye" for his track but then decided to ask Dallin and Woodward to sing it instead. The title of the track was not confirmed but was to be credited as be "Run-D.M.C. featuring Bananarama". The song, 'Invincible', credited as Rev Run featuring Bananarama, did not surface until late 2014 on Rev Run's solo album Red Rhythm Rewind.

In June 2009, Bananarama performed at the Isle of Wight Festival. In August 2009, they performed at the 80s Rewind Festival in Henley-on-Thames alongside other '80s acts which included Rick Astley, Belinda Carlisle, and Kim Wilde. The duo also performed at The Manchester Gay Pride Festival over the August Bank Holiday weekend.

Bananarama released a new single entitled "Love Comes" (UK #44) and a new album Viva (UK #87) in September 2009. The album was produced by Ian Masterson and released through Fascination Records. A second single was released from the album in April 2010, a new remix of the song "Love Don't Live Here" (UK #114) backed by Ian Masterson's 2010 reworking of the 1995 single "Every Shade of Blue" and "The Runner" (originally recorded by The Three Degrees), remixed by Buzz Junkies. Other covers recorded during this period included Bryan Adams's "Run To You", Simon & Garfunkel's "The Sound of Silence", and Bryan Ferry's "Tokyo Joe". These were included as B-sides to the released singles and as bonus digital tracks to the parent album.

In September 2010, Bananarama were back in the studio with producer Ian Masterson, and recorded a Christmas song titled "Baby It's Christmas" (UK #199). The track was written by Dallin and Masterson and was released on 13 December in the UK and Europe as a digital EP. The track was also included on a US digital Christmas compilation entitled Super Dance Christmas Party, Volume 3. "Baby It's Christmas" reached #19 on the UK Indie Singles chart and #199 on the main UK Singles Chart.

In April 2011, Bananarama appeared on ITV's hit comedy Benidorm and performed "Love in the First Degree", "Robert De Niro's Waiting...", and "Movin' On".

In October 2011, Bananarama performed at Retrolicious 2011 in Singapore, together with The Human League and Belinda Carlisle.

Dallin and Woodward continued to perform live since 2002, with highlights including headlining the festival of the Handover of Hong Kong, The Isle of Wight Festival, and the Singapore Grand Prix. In 2012, they embarked upon a 10-date USA tour for the Pinktober Hard Rock charity and released and EP 'Now or Never'. 
 
In 2016, they played a sell-out tour of Australia and as well as dates in Japan.

2012–2016: 30 Years of Bananarama and Now or Never
On 9 July 2012, Warner Music imprint Rhino Records released a greatest hits CD and DVD Collection 30 Years of Bananarama to celebrate the band's 30th anniversary. The album charted at #62 on the UK Albums Chart. On 9 August 2012, the band performed at the men's final of the beach volleyball at the London Olympics. They performed a medley of "Cruel Summer", "Love in the First Degree", and "Venus".

On 28 October 2013, Bananarama's first six albums Deep Sea Skiving, Bananarama, True Confessions, Wow!, Pop Life and Please Yourself were reissued by Edsel Records, each of them consisting of Deluxe 2CDs plus DVD. Bananarama are also confirmed to perform in 2014 at Let's Rock Bristol! (7 June), Let's Rock Leeds! (21 June) and Let's Rock Southampton! (12 July). On 9 November 2013, Bananarama revealed on the BBC show Pointless Celebrities that they were recording a new album in Nashville and that it would be influenced by country and pop.

In March 2015, Edsel Records released Megarama, a 3 CD collection of remixes that was followed in August with a 33 CD singles collection box set entitled In A Bunch, which contains all single releases from "Aie a Mwana" right through to "More, More, More". In 2016, Bananarama toured Australia in February and showcased their new song "Got to Get Away". On 9 March 2016, Sara confirmed on her Twitter page that Bananarama had signed a new deal with BMG. In November 2016, an excerpt of a song with the working title "Looking For Someone" was posted on the official Twitter page of the band.

In December 2016, Billboard magazine ranked them the 94th most successful dance artist of all time.

2017–present: Original line-up tour, In Stereo, Really Saying Something and  Masquerade

On 23 April 2017 Fahey rejoined Bananarama. The Original Line-up Tour saw them perform 23 sell-out dates across the UK in November and December 2017. They performed many of their hits such as "Nathan Jones", "Robert De Niro's Waiting...", "Cruel Summer", "Really Saying Something", "I Heard A Rumour", "I Can't Help It", "Venus", and "Love in the First Degree" as well as the Shakespears Sister hit "Stay". In February 2018, they played four dates in North America: Los Angeles, San Francisco, and New York in the United States; and Toronto in Canada. Their performances at London's Eventim Apollo Hammersmith Theatre and Newcastle City Hall were released on CD, DVD, and Blu-Ray through PledgeMusic in July 2018. Their final dates as a trio were in August 2018. In November 2018, Bananarama's first six London albums, Deep Sea Skiving, Bananarama, True Confessions, Wow!, Pop Life, and Please Yourself were released as coloured vinyl and limited-edition cassettes.

On 22 December 2018, Dallin and Woodward again appeared as contestants on the Christmas Special of the game show Pointless Celebrities, which featured musical acts with Christmas number one hits. Dallin and Woodward (who had Christmas number ones with the original Band Aid and Band Aid II) won the episode, winning the £2,500 jackpot for their charities of choice.

On 19 April 2019, Dallin and Woodward released their new album In Stereo (UK #29). The first track from the album that served as a taster was "Dance Music", followed by the first official single "Stuff Like That", which was released on 7 March. An accompanying video to the single was directed by Andy Morahan, who had also directed the videos for many former singles from "I Heard a Rumour" to "Preacher Man". On 30 March the album track "Looking for Someone" premiered on The Graham Norton Show on BBC Radio 2 and was released as the second single from In Stereo. The album was supported by a five-date promo tour in the UK, which later that year was released as a live album entitled Live in Stereo.

On 29 October 2020, Dallin and Woodward released their autobiography, entitled Really Saying Something.

On 29 April 2022, Dallin and Woodward released the taster track "Favourite" from their twelfth album Masquerade, which was released on 22 July 2022. On 15 June 2022, the album title track "Masquerade" was released as the first official single, and its music video followed two days later. A second taster track entitled "Velvet Lies" followed on 18 July 2022. On 12 August 2022, "Forever Young" was released as the official second single. On 14 October 2022, "Running With The Night" was released as the official third single.

Awards and nominations
{| class="wikitable sortable plainrowheaders" 
|-
! scope="col" | Award
! scope="col" | Year
! scope="col" | Category
! scope="col" | Nominee(s)
! scope="col" | Result
! scope="col" class="unsortable"| 
|-
! scope="row" rowspan=10|Billboard Music Awards
| rowspan=6|1986
| Top Hot 100 Artist
| rowspan=3|Themselves
| 
|rowspan=6|
|-
| Top Dance Club Play Artist
| 
|-
| Top Dance Sales Artist
| 
|-
| Top Hot 100 Song
| rowspan=3|"Venus"
| 
|-
| Top Dance Club Play Single
| 
|-
| Top Dance Sales Single
| 
|-
| rowspan=4|1987
| Top Hot 100 Artist
| rowspan=2|Themselves
| 
|rowspan=4|
|-
| Top Dance Club Play Artist
| 
|-
| Top Hot 100 Song
| rowspan=2|"I Heard a Rumour"
| 
|-
| Top Dance Club Play Single
| 
|-
! scope="row" rowspan=2|Brit Awards
| 1988
| British Single of the Year
| "Love in the First Degree"
| 
|
|-
| 1989
| British Video of the Year
| "Nathan Jones"
| 
|
|-
! scope="row" rowspan=2|Classic Pop Readers' Awards
| 2018
| Group of the Year
| Themselves
| 
| 
|-
| 2020
| Album of the Year
| In Stereo
| 
|
|-
! scope="row" rowspan=2|International Dance Music Awards
| rowspan=2|2007
| Best HiNRG/Euro Dance Track 
| rowspan=2|"Look on the Floor"
|
|rowspan=2|
|-
| Best Dance Music Video
| 
|-
! scope="row"|Smash Hits Poll Winners Party
| 1989
| Best Group
| Themselves
| 
|

Members

Current members
Sara Dallin 
Keren Woodward

Former members
Siobhan Fahey  
Jacquie O'Sullivan

Timeline

Discography

Studio albums
Deep Sea Skiving (1983)
Bananarama (1984)
True Confessions (1986)
Wow! (1987)
Pop Life (1991)
Please Yourself (1993)
Ultra Violet (1995)
Exotica (2001)
Drama (2005)
Viva (2009)
In Stereo (2019)
Masquerade (2022)

Concert tours
 Lovekids Tour (1988)
 Bananarama World Tour (1989)
 Ultra Violet/Dance Mix 95 Tour (1995–1996)
 Bananarama Australian Tour (1997)
 Bananarama & Culture Club UK Tour (1999)
 Drama Tour (2005–2006)
 Here and Now Tour (2007–2009)
 Viva Tour (2009–2010)
 The Bananarama USA Tour (2012)
 Europe Tour (2014–2015)
 The 2016 Australian Tour (2016)
 The Original Line Up UK Tour (2017)
 The Original Line Up North America and European Tour (2018)
 The 2019 Australian Tour (2019)
 In Stereo UK Tour (2019)

List of all record labels

 London Records (UK, USA, and Canada, 1981–1993)
 ZYX Records (Germany, 1994–1996)
 avex trax (Japan, 1995 / Taiwan, 2006)
 Quality Records (Canada, 1995)
 Mega Records (Denmark, 1995)
 DigIt International (Italy, 1995)
 Festival Records (Australia, 1995)
 Popular Records (Canada 1996)
 Curb Records (USA,1996)
 M6 Interactions (France, 2000)
 A&G Productions (UK, 2004–2006)
 The Lab (USA, 2006)
 True North Records (Canada, 2006)
 Edel Company (Germany, 2006)
 EQ Music (Singapore and Malaysia, 2005)
 Phantom Imports (Hong Kong, 2006)
 Central Station (Australia, 2005)
 Pony Canyon (Japan, 2006)
 Universal Records (Philippines, 2005)
 Blanco y Negro Records (Spain,1995–2006)
 Megaliner Records (Russia, 2005)
 Nice Records (France, 2007)
 Fascination Records (UK, 2009–2010)
 BMG (UK, 2016–19)
 Absolute Label Services (UK, 2019–)

See also
Girl group
List of best-selling girl groups

References

External links

Bananarama official website
Bananarama Community
 

Musical groups established in 1981
British new wave girl groups
British Eurodance groups
English pop music duos
Dance-pop groups
Deram Records artists
English dance music groups
British hi-NRG groups
English new wave musical groups
English dance girl groups
English pop girl groups
London Records artists
British musical trios
Musical groups from London
Polydor Records artists
ZYX Music artists
Female musical duos
Second British Invasion artists
Live Here Now artists